Thomas A. (Tom) Desjardin (born 1964). An American historian, Desjardin has written books on the American Civil War and American Revolutionary War. He also served as director of Maine's State Park system and as Maine's Commissioner of the Department of Education. He was born at St. Mary's Hospital, now Saint Mary's Regional Medical Center (Maine) in Lewiston, Maine.

Academic career 

Desjardin earned a bachelor's degree in government and a master's degree in communication from Florida State University, where he was a member of Phi Gamma Delta fraternity. He earned a Ph.D. in U.S. History from the University of Maine and has taught at his alma mater (FSU), at Bowdoin College, and the University of Maine. He is also a former fellow at the Gilder Lehrman Institute of American History in New York City.

Books 

 Stand Firm Ye Boys From Maine: The 20th Maine and the Gettysburg Campaign (Oxford University Press)  "Priceless. It reminded me that though historical fiction and drama has its place, written history must be the first source for the lay reader as well as the specialist." - UK Guardian
 These Honored Dead: How the Story of Gettysburg Shaped American Memory (DaCapo Press)  - "Utterly magnificent." - Esquire.  "A literary masterpiece." - UK Guardian.  "Wonderfully written, provocative and informative." - Civil War News. 
 Through A Howling Wilderness: Benedict Arnold's March to Quebec, 1775 (St. Martins Press) 
 Joshua L. Chamberlain: A Handbook (Greystone Communications) 
 Joshua L. Chamberlain: A Life in Letters (Osprey Publishing)

Television & Film 

1993 - Feature Film Gettysburg (1993 film). Historical advisor to actor Jeff Daniels - In 2011, Daniels said publicly of his role as Joshua Chamberlain: "For me, whatever people think that role was, it is because of Tom Desjardin."
1999, 2006, 2013 C-SPAN's Book TV
1999 - History Channel - Unknown Civil War series - on air historical consultant
2000 - History Channel - Joshua L. Chamberlain
2000 - A&E Network - Biography
2015 - The Gettysburg Address (film) - In Production.

Seminole Trivia 

While a student at FSU in 1984, Desjardin was the emcee at a pep rally and introduced the famous "Seminole War Chant" to FSU fans for the first time.

Career 

A former archivist/historian at Gettysburg National Military Park, much of his historical research has been devoted to Joshua Lawrence Chamberlain, on the mythology of the Gettysburg story, and Maine history.  His work was twice nominated for the prestigious Lincoln Prize. Desjardin has appeared in nationally televised documentaries numerous times and was the historical consultant for actor Jeff Daniels in his role as Chamberlain in the 1993 movie Gettysburg. In a span of nearly two decades in Maine State Government he served as the Chief Historian for Maine's Department of Conservation and as the Director of Maine's Bureau of Parks and Lands. During his tenure as director, the state park system achieved all-time records in both visitation and revenue.

In 2014, Maine governor Paul LePage appointed Desjardin to serve as the state's Commissioner of Education.

Athletics 

In the mid-1970s, Desjardin played third base for the undefeated champion B.A. Smith baseball team in the Kennebunk (Maine) Little League.

References

Sources 
 The Florida State Times http://www.nolefan.org/barnes/barnes07.html
 Stand Firm Ye Boys From Maine: The 20th Maine and the Gettysburg Campaign (Oxford University Press) 

1964 births
21st-century American historians
American male non-fiction writers
Living people
People from Lewiston, Maine
Bowdoin College faculty
Florida State University alumni
University of Maine alumni
Historians from Maine
Historians of the American Civil War
21st-century American male writers